Antoine Blanc de Saint-Bonnet (28 January 1815 – 2 June 1880) was a French philosopher, whose ideas were a precursor to modern sociology.

Works
 L'Unité Spirituelle (1841; Pitois, 3 vol., 1845).
 De la Douleur (1849; Club du Livre Rare, 1961; Les Editions de La Reconquête, 2012: with a review by Barbey d'Aurevilly and a letter by Léon Bloy).
 La Restauration Française (1851; Laroche, 1872).
 L'Affaiblissement de la Raison (1853).
 Politique Réelle (1858; Editions du Trident, 1990).
 L'Infaillibilité (1861; Nouvelles Éditions Latines, 1956).
 La Raison. Philosophie Fondamentale (1866).
 La Légitimité (1873).
 La Loi Électorale et les Deux Chambres (1875).
 Le XVIIIe Siècle (1878).
 Le Socialisme et la Société (1880; Presses Académiques, 1954).
 L'Amour et la Chute (1898).

References

Further reading

 Baranger, Yves (1973). Conceptions Politiques et Sociales de Blanc de Saint-Bonnet. Mémoire DES, Panthéon-Assas University.
 Barbey d'Aurevilly, Jules (1880). Les Prophètes du Passé. Paris: Victor Palmé.
 Barbey d'Aurevilly, Jules (1910). Joseph de Maistre, Blanc de Saint-Bonnet, Lacordaire, Gratry, Caro. Paris: Bloud.
 Buche, Joseph (1904). Blanc de Saint-Bonnet, le Philosophe de la Douleur. Trévoux: Imprimerie Jules Jeannin.
 Burton, Richard (1993). "La Douleur est Donc un Bien: Baudelaire et Blanc de Saint-Bonnet," Lettres Romanes, Vol. 47, No. 4, pp. 243–255.
 Chastenet, Jonathan Ruiz de (2008). "Le Sens Métaphysique de la Révolution chez Blanc de Saint-Bonnet." In: Le Livre Noir de la Révolution Française. Paris: Editions du Cerf.
 Christoflour, Raymond (1954). "Blanc de Saint-Bonnet Prophète de la Douleur." In: Prophètes du XIXe Siècle. Paris: La Colombe.
 Drouin, Jacques (1969). "Le Mot Révolution chez Blanc de Saint-Bonnet," Cahiers de Lexicologie, No. 15, pp. 27–34.
 Dumas, Jean-Louis (1983). "Souveraineté et Légitimité chez Blanc de Saint-Bonnet," Cahiers de Philosophie Politique de l'Université de Caen, No. 4, pp. 219–234.
 La Bigne de Villeneuve, Marcel de (1949). Un Grand Philosophe et Sociologue Méconnu: Blanc de Saint-Bonnet. Paris: Beauchesne.
 Maton, Gabriel (1961). Blanc de Saint-Bonnet, Philosophe de l'Unité Spirituelle. Lyon: Vitte.
 Néry, Alain (2005). "L'Aristocratie chez Blanc de Saint-Bonnet," Cahiers des Amis de Guy Augé, No. 9.
 Visan, Vincent Biétrix de (1944). Un Grand Philosophe Lyonnais: Blanc de Saint-Bonnet. Lyon: A. Rey.

External links
 Works by Antoine Blanc de Saint-Bonnet, at Europeana

French monarchists
French Roman Catholics
Roman Catholic writers
19th-century philosophers
French philosophers
Social philosophers
1815 births
1880 deaths
French male non-fiction writers
19th-century French male writers